James French (born May 21, 1992) is an American professional racing driver.

Racing career
Growing up in Wisconsin French started karting at age five at the Road America Motorplex. In his final season at the Road America Kart Club French finished second in the 80cc Shifter class.

Club racing
French made his debut in the C Sports Racer class at Road America in May 2008. He also raced against his father Brian in the Central Division SCCA championship. The father-son duo also raced at the June Sprints with Brian winning the class, and James finishing in second place. The following season James won the championship in a Swift 014.a with added bodywork. The younger French won also the June Sprints and placed third at the prestigious SCCA National Championship Runoffs.

In 2010 French ran a partial Central Division SCCA club championship in both the CSR and Formula Atlantic classes. He also competed in the SVRA at Road America in a Ralt RT41. The following season French won again the Cen-Div CSR championship. His strong result in the divisional championship earned him a third place in the SCCA Majors Tour. The fast Wisconsin driver also finished third at the June Sprints.

French again repeated his divisional championship in 2012. He did not finish on the podium in the Majors Tour. He again won the June Sprints in 2014. But as he did not win the Central Division championship he could not compete for the Majors Tour title. French competed at the SVRA Spring Vintage Festival winning his race in a Jordan 197.

Sportscar racing
French first raced in the American Le Mans Series in 2011. Competing in the LMPC class French ran one race with Intersport Racing. In 2012 he ran again one race, this time landing on the podium. At the 2012 Road Race Showcase French, Kyle Marcelli and Chapman Ducote finished third in class. For 2013 French ran three races with BAR1 Motorsports. At the season finale, the 2013 Petit Le Mans, French, Tomy Drissi and Rusty Mitchell finished third in class.

For 2014 French joined Performance Tech Motorsports for the last five races of the season. He scored a second place at Virginia International Raceway with teammate David Ostella. The following season he raced a full season in the United SportsCar Championship. The team failed to finish at the 2015 24 Hours of Daytona. However, he scored three consecutive third-place finishes after the season opener. He later scored another two podium finishes securing the sixth place in the championship.

Indy Lights
In November 2015 French tested a Dallara IL-15 with Schmidt Peterson Motorsports. He tested at Circuit of the Americas alongside Heamin Choi. During the Chris Griffis Memorial Test French was faster than Choi during all the sessions. During the 2016 season French made his race debut in Indy Lights. As Belardi Auto Racing driver Felix Rosenqvist had other obligations, French replaced the Swede at the Road America round of the championship. French qualified twelfth in a field of fourteen. In both races he worked his way up to eighth place.

Stock car racing

In August 2018, French joined JP Motorsports for his NASCAR Xfinity Series debut at Road America.

Racing record

SCCA National Championship Runoffs

American open-wheel racing results
(key) (Races in bold indicate pole position, races in italics indicate fastest race lap)

Indy Lights

Xfinity Series

 Season still in progress
 Ineligible for series points

Complete WeatherTech SportsCar Championship

References

External links
 
 

1992 births
Racing drivers from Wisconsin
WeatherTech SportsCar Championship drivers
American Le Mans Series drivers
Indy Lights drivers
SCCA National Championship Runoffs winners
Sportspeople from Sheboygan, Wisconsin
Living people
24 Hours of Daytona drivers
NASCAR drivers
Belardi Auto Racing drivers
Starworks Motorsport drivers
G-Drive Racing drivers
24H Series drivers